Christian Miguel Pinto Baez (born January 3, 1981, in Quito, Ecuador), often stated as C. Miguel Pinto or Miguel Pinto, is an Ecuadorian zoologist noted for his research work on rodents, small carnivora, and bats from the Neotropics (in particular in Ecuador, Argentina, and Colombia) and their parasites.

Career
In 2004, he described the bat species Lophostoma yasuni from the Yasuni National Park in Ecuador (together with René M. Fonseca). In 2006, he was among a team (including Roland Kays, Kristofer M. Helgen, Lauren Helgen, Don E. Wilson, and Jesús E. Maldonado) who did research work on a new olingo-like carnivore in the Ecuadorian Andes which was scientifically described as olinguito in 2013. In 2012, he was recipient of the Albert R. and Alma Shadle Fellowship
In 2013, he described the new shrew opossum Caenolestes sangay from Ecuador.

Pinto has been accused of a number of instances of sexual harassment, some of which he admitted, and as a result in 2016 was banned from the laboratories and collections of the Smithsonian Museum of Natural History.

References

1981 births
Ecuadorian zoologists
Living people